Ruslan Katyshev (born 18 April 1983) is a visually impaired Ukrainian track and field athlete. In track and field Katyshev competes in the T11 classification long jump and triple jump events. He is also a P11 classification pentathlete. Katyshev has competed at two Summer Paralympic Games, winning a gold (long jump) and a bronze medal (triple jump) at the 2012 Games in London.

References 

1983 births
Living people
Athletes from Saint Petersburg
Ukrainian male long jumpers
Ukrainian male triple jumpers
Ukrainian pentathletes
Paralympic athletes of Ukraine
Athletes (track and field) at the 2008 Summer Paralympics
Athletes (track and field) at the 2012 Summer Paralympics
Athletes (track and field) at the 2016 Summer Paralympics
Paralympic gold medalists for Ukraine
Paralympic bronze medalists for Ukraine
Medalists at the 2012 Summer Paralympics
Medalists at the 2016 Summer Paralympics
Paralympic medalists in athletics (track and field)
K. D. Ushinsky South Ukrainian National Pedagogical University alumni
World Para Athletics Championships winners
Medalists at the World Para Athletics European Championships
Visually impaired long jumpers
Visually impaired triple jumpers
Paralympic long jumpers
Paralympic triple jumpers